This is a list of singles which have reached number one on the Irish Singles Chart in 1987.

27 Number Ones
Most weeks at No.1 (song): "Hold Me Now" - Johnny Logan, "You Win Again" - The Bee Gees (4)
Most weeks at No.1 (artist): U2 (6)
Most No.1s: U2, Michael Jackson (3)

See also
1987 in music
Irish Singles Chart
List of artists who reached number one in Ireland

1987 in Irish music
1987 record charts
1987